The 2010–11 curling season began in September 2010 and ended in April 2011.

Note: In events with two genders, the men's tournament winners will be listed before the women's tournament winners.

CCA-sanctioned events
Season of Champions events in bold; other CCA-sanctioned events in regular typeface.

Other events

World Curling Tour
Grand Slam events in bold.

Teams

Men's events

Women's events

WCT Order of Merit rankings

WCT Money List

Cyber attack on curling websites
On January 14, 2011, four major curling websites (CurlingZone, World Curling Tour, Ontario Curling Tour, and Canadian Curling Reporters) went offline in an apparent cyber attack by hackers from China and Korea. The problem was found to be missing databases of painstakingly documented curling information dating back two years from primary and secondary backup systems. For many weeks, the four websites and any content supported by CurlingZone's software were unable to be accessed. The proprietors of the websites were forced to request the help of data recovery services to recover the lost data, which includes information on thousands of curling events both major, like the Olympics season, and minor. As a result of these presumed cyber attacks, the websites were switched to a new server and reloaded with whatever information was available at the time.

Capital One, the sponsor of the Grand Slam of Curling, the World Curling Championships, and various teams and bonspiels, stated a few days after the incident that they would match donations to CurlingZone to help the recovery effort and encouraged other curling-related businesses to donate money. However, people involved with CurlingZone and The Curling News expressed concern that much of the data is irrecoverable and may have disappeared forever. As of March, the websites are up and running, but the content from last year and many years preceding it are still missing.

In another event, the websites of U.S. and world curling governing bodies were attacked by sites in China and Korea. The attacks may be related to the attacks on the four major curling websites.

The Dominion MA Cup
The Dominion MA Cup presented by TSN was created for the first time for the 2010-11 season. The Cup is awarded to the Canadian Curling Association Member Association (MA) who has had the most success during the season in the CCA sanctioned events. Events include the Canadian Mixed, Men's & Women's Juniors, the Scotties, the Brier, Men's & Women's Seniors and the national Wheelchair championship.

The inaugural title will go to both Alberta and Saskatchewan. Both MAs finished with the highest number of points, in a tie. The tie breaking procedure is the best record between the two MAs in round robin games, but the two MAs split their season series 4-4.

Alberta did not win any national titles; it was runner up in three events, and finished in the top six in all events. Saskatchewan, on the other hand, won both junior events and the Scotties. Manitoba finished third, having also won three events (the Brier, the men's seniors, the national wheelchairs).

The Governors Cup was also awarded, to the Member Association who has seen the most improvement. It was given to New Brunswick.

Points are awarded based on placement in each of the events, with the top association receiving 14 points, then the second place team with 13, etc.

Final standings

Capital One Cup
The Capital One Cup is a season-long competition that awards curling teams point values for their participation in Capital One Grand Slam of Curling events. At the end of the season, the men's and women's teams with the top three point values are awarded purse totalling CAD$170,000. The top-ranked team is awarded $50,000, the second-ranked team $25,000, and the third-ranked team $10,000.

The points are allocated as follows:

Notable team changes

Retirements
 Richard Hart, longtime third for Glenn Howard, retired from high-performance curling due to considerations regarding his career. Hart was the 1998 Olympic silver medallist as third under Mike Harris, and the 2007 Brier winner and 2007 World Champion as third under Howard. He also was the six-time Ontario provincial champion with Howard and won eight Grand Slams with Howard.
 Blake MacDonald, longtime third and fourth for Kevin Koe, retired from high-performance curling due to his work schedule and family commitments. MacDonald was the 2010 Brier winner and 2010 World Champion with Koe, and also won the 2008 Canada Cup of Curling with Koe.
 Kathy O'Rourke retired from curling after her team announced that they would break up. O'Rourke was a former Canadian Mixed champion and has represented PEI at 6 Scotties, including the 2010 Scotties, where she and her team were the runner-up to Jennifer Jones.

Careers on hiatus
 Mark Nichols, longtime third for Brad Gushue, announced that he would be taking a hiatus from high-performance curling for the 2011–12 curling season in order to spend more time with his family. Nichols was the 2006 Olympic gold medallist as third under Russ Howard and the 2007 Brier runner-up as third under Gushue.

Team line-up changes
Teams listed by skip, new teammates listed in bold
 Cheryl Bernard: Following the breakup of Bernard's Olympic silver medal-winning team of Susan O'Connor, Carolyn Darbyshire, and Cori Morris, Bernard and longtime third O'Connor will join new teammates Lori Olson-Johns and Jennifer Sadlier at second and lead, respectively. Darbyshire will remain as alternate, while Morris has joined another team. Bernard's new second Olson-Johns has curled with Crystal Webster and Cathy King, while new lead Sadlier is a former junior provincial champion and has experience playing in provincial championships.
 Brad Gushue: Following Nichols' announcement of his hiatus from curling, Gushue promoted Manitoba native Ryan Fry to the third position and added Geoff Walker of Alberta and Adam Casey of PEI as his second and lead, respectively. Fry has been on the Gushue rink since the 2008–09 curling season; Walker and Casey were successful junior curlers.
 Glenn Howard: Following the departure of Richard Hart, former teammate Wayne Middaugh will take the third position in Howard's team. Middaugh is a two-time world champion and former teammate of Glenn Howard. Middaugh served as the substitute for Hart on the Howard rink during the 2010 Canada Cup of Curling, which Howard won.
 Kevin Koe: Following the departure of Blake MacDonald, Saskatchewan native Pat Simmons will replace MacDonald at the third position. Simmons has represented Saskatchewan at five Briers, including four consecutive appearances from 2005–2008.
 Cathy Overton-Clapham: After one season together, lead Raunora Westcott and second Leslie Wilson have left the team. Jenna Loder and Ashley Howard have joined the team at third and second, while Breanne Meakin, who remains with Overton-Clapham, moves from third to lead. 
 Serge Reid: Reid announced in a tweet that Pierre Charette will be joining his team as skip, throwing lead stones. Charette is a former Quebec provincial champion and Brier runner-up and is known for being the only curler to play all five positions at the Brier.
 Crystal Webster: Following the breakup of Kathy O'Rourke's PEI Scotties team, Erin Carmody and Geri-Lynn Ramsay announced that they would be joining forces with Webster, whose third Lori Olson-Johns had left to join the Cheryl Bernard rink. The PEI Scotties team skipped by O'Rourke, which had Carmody throwing fourth stones and Ramsay throwing third stones, finished as runner-up to the Jennifer Jones rink at the 2010 Scotties.

References

See also
World Curling Tour Home 
Season of Champions Home

2010-2011
2010-2011
2010-2011